Eldersloo is a hamlet in the Netherlands and is part of the Aa en Hunze municipality in Drenthe.

Eldersloo is not a statistical entity, but has its own postal code. It was first mentioned in 1302 as de Heilerslo, and probably means "forest of alder trees". In 1840, it was home to 8 people. Nowadays, it has about 15 houses.

References 

Populated places in Drenthe
Aa en Hunze